Jos van Herpen (born April 28, 1962) is a Dutch former football defender.

References
 Profile
 RKC Waalwijk official site

1962 births
Living people
Dutch footballers
Dutch expatriate footballers
FC Den Bosch players
Feyenoord players
RKC Waalwijk players
Van Herpen, Jos
Van Herpen, Jos
Eredivisie players
Van Herpen, Jos
People from Vught
Association football defenders
Van Herpen, Jos